The Battery F, 1st West Virginia Light Artillery Regiment was an artillery battery that served in the Union Army during the American Civil War.

Service
Battery F  was originally raised as Company C, 6th West Virginia Infantry Regiment and converted to an independent battery on April 8, 1863.

Battery F was absorbed by Battery A, 1st West Virginia Light Artillery Regiment September 14, 1864.

The 1st West Virginia Light Artillery Regiment lost 33 men, killed and died of wounds; 131 men, died of disease, accident or in prison; total deaths, 164 men. (all 8 batteries)

Captains were Thomas A. Maulsby first George W. Graham 2nd

[Source: Regimental Losses in the American Civil War, 1861–1865, by William F. Fox]

See also
West Virginia Units in the Civil War
West Virginia in the Civil War

External links
The Civil War Archive

Units and formations of the Union Army from West Virginia
Artillery units and formations of the American Civil War
1863 establishments in West Virginia
Military units and formations established in 1863
Military units and formations disestablished in 1864